NA-168 Bahawalpur-V is a constituency for the National Assembly of Pakistan.

Members of Parliament

2018-2022: NA-170 Bahawalpur-I

Election 2002 

General elections were held on 10 Oct 2002. Muhammad Farooq Azam Malik of National Alliance won by 30,361 votes.

Election 2008 

General elections were held on 18 Feb 2008. Muhammad Baligh Ur Rehman of PML-N won by 54,334 votes.

Election 2013 

General elections were held on 11 May 2013. Muhammad Baligh Ur Rehman of PML-N won by 88,379 votes and became the  member of National Assembly.

Election 2018 

General elections were held on 25 July 2018.

See also
NA-167 Bahawalpur-IV
NA-169 Rahim Yar Khan-I

References

External links 
Election result's official website

NA-185